San Jerónimo is a town and municipality in the Baja Verapaz department of Guatemala. The municipality is situated at 940 metres above sea level and has a population of 25,459 (2018 census). It covers an area of 275 km². The annual festival is September 28-September 30.

The predominant language is Spanish. There is a party and main fair held from 27 to 30 September each year, in honor of the patron Saint Jerome.

History

After the conquest of the Verapaces by the Spanish, the Hacienda de San Jerónimo was created, in the care of Dominican priests, it is believed that friars Luis Cancer, Bartolomé de las Casas, Luis de Ladrada and Pedro Angulo, were the first newcomers to the Valley of San Jerónimo, as Friar Luis Cancer ordered the construction of the Church in the year 1537 and, in the same year in October, took the news to the capital of the Kingdom of Guatemala.

The Hacienda was founded between the years 1540 and 1550.  The first sugar plantation in Central America was founded here in 1601 by Rafael Lujan, becoming the most important heritage of the Spanish Kingdom in Central America for its production of sugar, cochineal, grapes, wine and pot liquor ("licores de olla"); however, the friar preferred the grapes than the sugar cane plantations.

Friar Francisco Callejos, who was the manager of the Hacienda, constructed a Roman style aqueduct to bring water to the people. The Dominican coat of arms can be found in the ruins of the aqueduct, which still remain. It is located in the town of San Jerónimo, and can be more easily observed along the road to the San Lorenzo farm.

British settlement 

In early 1830s, from the top of the south mountains one can see the dry valley of Salamá, with its white-wall houses.  The road was in good condition, but the descent from the mountains to the creek that surrounded the valley was long and painful. Along the creek's shore there were numerous trees and vegetation, which serve a rest area for the travelers before continuing with the trip under the sun.  Salamá was a small town crossed by a crystalline creek and had a central square with palms in the middle of the valle.  Close to the town was the old convent, which was then considered as the largerst and most valuable property of the country, and which was sold in 1829 to Marshall Bennett, Francisco Morazán's commercial agent for the fine wood business in the region. Bennett called it "Hacienda de San Jerónimo", and soon had numerous sugar and coffee plantations, which we possible thanks to the upgrades of the old irrigation system; Bennett replaced the friars' vines with sugar cane plantations and the wine was replaced by a rum called "Puro de San Gerónimo", which became famous across the country.

The native and black settlers of Salamá were used to the monastery discipline, which Bennett's used in his benefit and his first few years were very profitable.  But later on, there were bitter disputes among his descendants and -with the friars gone- soon there were tense disagreements between the hacienda owners and the town's people.

Hacienda de San Jerónimo crisis 

But in 1890 the crisis deepened: natives and mestizos had invaded the outskirts of the hacienda and had been stealing wood and farming products, set several fields on fire, damaged the irrigation system and mutilated livestock. Eventually, an angry mob set the sugar mill on fire attacked the hacienda foreman. When things reached this point, the owners contacted the British Ambassador, who -after negotiation with the liberal government, who was well aware that its own officers had supported and promoted the attack- agreed to expel the invaders and pay a settlement for fourteen thousand Guatemalan pesos.  Besides, it was agreed to sell a portion of the hacienda to settle a town and give it the old church.

Tourism 

The main tourist attraction in the municipality is "El Trapiche" Museum, which contains and exhibition of the historical facts that happened both in the doctrine and the Hacienda of San Jerónimo.  Other archeological sites can be found in: El Portón, Laguna, Los Mangales, Matanzas, Pueblo Viejo, Sibabaj, Xubalbal, Zacualpa and La Presa.

Climate

San Jerónimo has a tropical savanna climate (Köppen: Aw).

Geographic location 

San Jerónimo borders only two municipalities: Salamá in Baja Verapaz Department and Morazán in El Progreso Department:

See also 
 
 
 Francisco Morazán
 List of places in Guatemala
 Order of Preachers

Notes and references

Notes

References

Bibliography

External links
Muni in Spanish
http://www.inforpressca.com/sanjeronimo/historia.php
http://www.arqueotur.org/yacimientos/hacienda-de-san-jeronimo-museo-regional-del-trapiche.html

Municipalities of the Baja Verapaz Department